Bai Zijian (born 16 October 1992) is a Chinese footballer of Korean descent who plays for Zibo Cuju in the China League One.

Club career

Bai Zijian is an ethnic Korean Chinese who would predominantly concentrate on his studies before moving into football where with the help of a family friend and former professional footballer Wang Chao, he was able to enroll with second tier football club Shenyang Dongjin's youth team. Very little would come from his period with Shenyang, however he would be scouted by the Chongqing Lifan manager Li Shubin who was impressed by Bai and would sign him as a youth player. Despite joining a top tier football club and being promoted to the first squad, Bai actually saw no playing time throughout the entire 2010 season. Often spending most of the season as a translator for teammate Cho Se-Kwon, Bai's time at the club was cut short when Li Shubin was sacked due to a poor run of results and Bai was surplus to requirements at the end of the season.

Almost giving up on football and returning to his education, Bai was persuaded to go to a training session held in Guangzhou for K-League side Daejeon Citizen and impressed the team's manager Wang Sun-Jae who would sign the player on 14 February 2011 after a successful trial. He made his debut for the club on 6 March 2011 in a league match against Ulsan Hyundai, coming on as a substitute for 90th minute in a 2-1 victory. After a one-year stint, Daejeon made a decision to not extend his contract. He then joined South Korean second division club Goyang KB in February 2012 and received little playing time at the club throughout the season.

Bai left Goyang KB to join Chinese Super League club Changchun Yatai for the 2013 season. He made his league debut on 5 October 2013 against Guangzhou R&F in a 1-0 away defeat.

Bai joined China League One newcomer Heilongjiang Lava Spring on 28 February 2018.

Career statistics 
Statistics accurate as of match played 31 December 2020.

References

External links 

1992 births
Living people
Association football forwards
Chinese footballers
Footballers from Shenyang
Chinese expatriate footballers
Chongqing Liangjiang Athletic F.C. players
Changchun Yatai F.C. players
Daejeon Hana Citizen FC players
Shenyang Dongjin players
Goyang KB Kookmin Bank FC players
Heilongjiang Ice City F.C. players
K League 1 players
Korea National League players
Chinese expatriate sportspeople in South Korea
Expatriate footballers in South Korea
Chinese Super League players
China League One players
China League Two players
Chinese people of Korean descent